Palazzo Davanzati is a palace in Florence, Italy. It houses the Museum of the Old Florentine House.

History
Palazzo Davanzati was erected in the second half of the 14th century by the Davizzi family, who were wealthy members of the wool guild. In 1516 it was sold to the Bartolini and, later that century, to the Davanzati family, also rich merchants (1578), who held it until 1838. After the suicide of Carlo Davanzati, it was split into different quarters and modified. After escaping the numerous demolitions of 19th century Florence, it was bought by Elia Volpi, an antiquarian, who restored It in (his impression of) the original style.

In 1910, Volpi opened the building as a private museum (Museo Privato della Casa Fiorentina Antica). The contents of this museum kept changing as Volpi sold the furniture at auctions, including a major one in 1916 in New York. In the 1920s, Egyptian antique dealers Vitale and Leopoldo Bengujat acquired the building and its contents. In 1951 it was purchased by the Italian state and kept open as a museum. By 1995 the museum needed to be closed for major restoration to keep the building from falling down. The museum was partially reopened in 2005 with the ground and first floors;  by 2012 all the floors were open to visitors.

Architecture
The palace consists of a facade that unifies a grouping of earlier, medieval tower homes that the owner purchased with the intent to put them together.

It is constructed in sandstone, with three large portals on the horizontal axis, and three stories of mullioned windows. The topmost floor has a loggia supported by four columns and two pilasters that was added in the 16th century. The façade displays the Davanzati coats of arms and has traces of other decorations.

The interior courtyard has arches, vaults, and capitals in 14th century-style.

Interior
The following rooms can be visited:

Ground floor: Atrium
Entered through one of three large portals. This large room was used to conduct business. Presently it used to display objects and information related to the history of the building.

Ground floor: Courtyard
All the rooms of the building communicate on to hallways that open onto the central courtyard.

First floor: Great Hall
This large room was used for conducting business. Its large windows give on to the street. There are three square holes covered by wooden covers in correspondence with the openings of the atrium below on to the street; these were used to observe who was walking in, and eventually for defense purposes. The room is now set up as a museum with a table in the center with various sixteenth century objects on display.

First floor: Sala dei Pappagalli (Room of the Parrots)
The so-called Sala dei Pappagalli has wall paintings designed to look like patchwork wall-hangings lined with miniver, with motifs of parrots painted or embroidered on the blocks. These paintings are much restored and so may not look like the original frescoes. A large fireplace dominates this room. On display is maiolica from Montelupo.

First floor: Bathroom
A small room with indoor plumbing.

First floor: Study (studiolo)
This room, which does not retain any of its original wall decoration, was probably a study. Objects on display include a forziere (locking chest), cassone, small sculptures, and paintings.

First floor: Bedroom
The Sala dei Pavoni'''s frescoes show instead a false geometrical tapestry and a row of coat of arms of families allied with the Davizzi. It is currently set up with a bed and cradle. There is a small ensuite bathroom.

Second floor: Bedroom
The bedroom of the second floor, is called of the Chatelain of Vergy in honor of the frescoes inspired to the medieval romance of The Châtelaine de Vergy. full of love, adventure and death.
In the same bedroom you can see a beautiful "Desco da Parto" painted by Scheggia, Masaccio's brother.

Upper floor

On the third floor are the Camera delle Impannate'', another bedroom, and the Kitchen. The Impannate were cotton or linen textile, dyed in wax, put in a wood frame and inserted in the windows were in substitution of the glass, that was very expensive.

The kitchen is at the top floor because the hot air rising from cooking stayed away from the lower living spaces in the heat of summer, and also to minimize damage in the event of an out-of-control fire. The room features a fireplace with bellows and two turnspits, a wooden bread-kneading machine, a metal butter churn and other tools from that period, or later on.

References

External links
Official website
arttrav Information and photos from arttrav.com
 Museums in Florence - Davanzati Palace

Houses completed in the 14th century
Davanzati
Museums in Florence